Rocks of Ages: Science and Religion in the Fullness of Life is a 1999 book about the relationship between science and religion by the Harvard paleontologist Stephen Jay Gould. First published by Ballantine Books, it was reprinted by Vintage Books. The book is a volume in the series, The Library of Contemporary Thought.

Summary
Gould addresses the conflict between secular scientists and religious believers who question or deny scientific theory when it is in discrepancy with religious teachings on the origin and nature of the natural world. Borrowing a term from the Catholic Church, Gould describes science and religion as each comprise a separate magisterium of human understanding. Science defines the natural world, and religion the moral world. If each realm is separate, then according to Gould, they are not in conflict. He calls this the principle of non-overlapping magisteria, abbreviated NOMA.

Reception
The book has been reviewed extensively, and commented on by both sides of the conflict he addresses.

See also
Intelligent design
Richard Dawkins
Moral Landscape

References

External links
Rocks of Ages at Ballantine Books website

1999 non-fiction books
American non-fiction books
Ballantine Books books
Books by Stephen Jay Gould
English-language books